József Asbóth defeated Eric Sturgess 8–6, 7–5, 6–4 in the final to win the men's singles tennis title at the 1947 French Championships.

Seeds
The seeded players are listed below. József Asbóth is the champion; at others the round is shown in which they were eliminated.

  Tom Brown (semifinals)
  Budge Patty (fourth round)
  Marcel Bernard (semifinals)
  Yvon Petra (quarterfinals)
  József Asbóth (champion)
  Giovanni Cucelli (quarterfinals)
  Eric Sturgess (finalist)
  Enrique Morea (third round)
  Marcello Del Bello (third round)
  William Sidwell (third round)
  Robert Abdesselam (fourth round)
  Mario Belardinelli (fourth round)
  Vladimír Černík (second round)
  Eustace Fannin (third round)
  Geoffrey Paish (second round)
  Tony Mottram (fourth round)

Draw

Key
 Q = Qualifier
 WC = Wild card
 LL = Lucky loser
 r = Retired

Finals

Earlier rounds

Section 1

Section 2

Section 3

Section 4

Section 5

Section 6

Section 7

Section 8

References

External links

   on the French Open website

1947 in French tennis
1947